In the mathematical field of representation theory, a Herz–Schur multiplier (named after Carl S. Herz and Issai Schur) is a special kind of mapping from a group to the field of complex numbers.

Definition
Let Ψ be a mapping of a group G to the complex numbers. It is a Herz–Schur multiplier if the induced map Ψ: N(G) → N(G) is a completely positive map, where N(G) is the closure of the span M of the image of λ in B(ℓ 2(G)) with respect to the weak topology, λ is the left regular representation of G and Ψ is on M defined as

See also
 Figà-Talamanca–Herz algebra
 Fourier algebra

References

 
 
Carl S. Herz. Une généralisation de la notion de transformée de Fourier-Stieltjes. Annales de l'Institut Fourier, tome 24, no 3 (1974), p. 145-157.

Representation theory
Harmonic analysis